The lesser gray-brown musk shrew (Crocidura silacea) is a species of mammal in the family Soricidae. It is found in Angola, Malawi, Mozambique, South Africa, Swaziland, Tanzania, Uganda, Zambia, and Zimbabwe. Its natural habitats are dry savanna, subtropical or tropical dry shrubland, Mediterranean-type shrubby vegetation, subtropical or tropical high-elevation grassland, and rocky areas.

References
 Baxter, R. 2004.  Crocidura silacea.   2006 IUCN Red List of Threatened Species.   Downloaded on 30 July 2007.

Crocidura
Mammals described in 1895
Taxa named by Oldfield Thomas
Taxonomy articles created by Polbot